An evergreen forest is a forest made up of evergreen trees. They occur across a wide range of climatic zones, and include trees such as conifers and holly in cold climates, eucalyptus, Live oak, acacias, magnolia, and banksia in more temperate zones, and rainforest trees in tropical zones.

Species of trees
Coniferous temperate evergreen forests are most frequently dominated by species in the families. The trees include: Pinaceae and Cupressaceae. Broadleaf temperate evergreen forests include those in which Fagaceae, such as oaks and ferns are common, those in which Nothofagaceae predominate, and the eucalyptus forests of the Southern Hemisphere. There also are assorted temperate evergreen forests dominated by other families of trees, such as Lauraceae in laurel forest.

Regions
Broadleaf evergreen forests occur in particular in southern China, southeastern Brazil, and parts of southeastern North America. and in countries around the Mediterranean Basin, such as Lebanon and Morocco. Other evergreen forests (or tropical rainforests) are usually found in areas receiving more than 234 cm of rainfall and having a monthly mean temperature of 20 °C or higher in the coldest months. They occupy about seven percent of the Earth's surface and harbour more than half of the planet's terrestrial plants and animals. Tropical evergreen forests are dense, multi-layered, and harbour many types of plants and animals. These forests are found in the areas receiving heavy rainfall (more than 200  cm annual rainfall). They are very dense. Even the sunlight does not reach the ground. Numerous species of trees are found in these forests. In some regions, some types of trees shed their leaves at different times of the year. Therefore, these forests always appear green and are known as evergreen forest.

See also 
Deciduous forest
Biomes
Ecoregion
Ecological land classification
List of terrestrial ecoregions (WWF)
 Temperate coniferous forest

References

External links
Tropical Evergreen Forests.

Forests
Habitat
Habitats
Temperate coniferous forests
Tropical and subtropical coniferous forests
Tropical and subtropical moist broadleaf forests
Taiga and boreal forests
Ecoregions
Wildlife